François Dubanchet (5 May 1923 – 26 March 2019) was a French politician.

References

1923 births
2019 deaths
Senators of Loire (department)
Union for French Democracy politicians
20th-century French politicians
Mayors of Saint-Étienne